This was the second season of the club that was to become Arsenal F.C. In this season they moved from the common of Plumstead Ground to the privately owned Sportsman Ground, in order to charge an entrance fee to view games. The nearby Sportsman Pub was used as a dressing room. This season was notable for their inaugural participation in the London Senior Cup, and home and away games against enduring rivals, Tottenham Hotspur.

Players
Below is a list of all Arsenal Players reported to play for them that season, and all confirmed appearances and goals. Out of the 24 games played that season, confirmed line-ups were recovered for 12 of these games, and goalscorers for 11. Players who predominantly played as goalkeepers are marked in Italics.

Management 
There was no manager for the 1887-88 season, though Fred Beardsley, Arthur Brown (both players) and Duncan Porteous were positioned as joint-secretaries amongst others, after Elijah Watkins left the position of secretary at the beginning of the season.

Pre-season

Friendlies

Competitions

Overview
{|class="wikitable" style="text-align:left"
|-
!rowspan=2 style="width:140px;"|Competition
!colspan=8|Record
|-
!style="width:40px;"|
!style="width:40px;"|
!style="width:40px;"|
!style="width:40px;"|
!style="width:40px;"|
!style="width:40px;"|
!style="width:40px;"|
!style="width:70px;"|
|-
|London Senior Cup

|-
!Total

London Senior Cup

References

Arsenal F.C. seasons
English football clubs 1887–88 season